Ying Wa College (also referred to as YWC, Anglo-Chinese College) is a direct subsidised boys' secondary school in Kowloon, Hong Kong near Nam Cheong station. It was established (as the Anglo-Chinese College) in Malacca in 1818 by the first Protestant missionary to China, Rev. Robert Morrison. In 1843, the college was moved to Hong Kong. Being the only school with over 200 years of history, it is the oldest school in Hong Kong.

The College Deed, signed in 1821, stated that the objective of the school was the reciprocal cultivation of English and Chinese literature as well as the diffusion of Christianity.

Didi Tang of The Times, in 2021, stated that Ying Wa is a "well-known school" in Hong Kong.

History

Foundation
Robert Morrison of the London Missionary Society arrived at China in 1807 to begin his work of evangelisation. He planned to establish a school that would allow Western missionaries to learn Oriental cultures and languages. He also hoped that the school would play a role on introducing the East to the West and vice versa; in other words, to mediate between the two civilisations, and thus to prepare the way for the quiet and peaceful dissemination of Christian thought in China. With the help of William Milne who joined Morrison in 1813, the Anglo-Chinese College was established in 1818 in Malacca with Milne as the first Headmaster. Even with Milne at its head, Morrison maintained a strong role in leading and fundraising for the school, and was a committed teacher.

Early period (1818–1858)
Apart from its work as a school, the college also trained evangelists and pastors. Amongst them, former student Rev. Hoh Fuk Tong was made pastor in 1846. He preached in Foshan and Canton to his fellow Chinese people. Liang Fa (also known as Leung Faat), who was a craftsman in the printing centre of the college, also heeded the call to preach Gospel.

A printing press was set up within the school premises to publish the Chinese Bible and other Chinese Christian tracts and publications, well before China was opened by the Opium Wars. In 1853, the first Chinese newspaper, Chinese Serial, was published by the college's printing press.

In 1840, James Legge became headmaster. Two years later, Hong Kong was ceded to the United Kingdom under the Treaty of Nanking. The London Missionary Society thus decided to move the college to Hong Kong in 1843. The school building was situated at the junction of Staunton Street and Aberdeen Street. At that time, Christian churches had not yet been officially established. Thus the college was used as a religious centre where Christians assembled to worship. Since the London Missionary Society deemed that the college should focus more on the training of evangelists after the relocation, the college was renamed "The Theological Seminary of the London Missionary Society in China." When Legge returned to Britain in 1846, he brought with him three of his Chinese students. Legge and the students were received by Queen Victoria.

Legge held his headship until he was appointed by the Hong Kong Government in 1864 to help prepare for the opening of Queen's College. Due to the lack of a successor as well as political instability, the college ceased to operate at the end of 1856 and teaching ended in 1858. But the printing press continued its work until 1870 when it was sold to Wang Tao and Wong Shing.

Restoration (1914–1929)
In 1911, the elders of the To Tsai Church together with Rev. Cheung Chuk Ling, Rev. W. T. Pearce and Rev. H. R. Wells revived the college so that the training of the sons of church members might be carried on. In 1913, the London Missionary Society responded to the appeal of the To Tsai Church. Rev. Arnold Hughes was sent to Hong Kong to assume headship, and the college was re-opened as a middle school in 1914 in rented premises, first at 9 Caine Road, later at 45 Caine Road, and finally at 82 Bonham Road (a former property of the German Rhenish Missionary).

The college grappled with many financial problems and it was at this time that help was received from the China Congregational Church. Financial assistance was also received from the Government.

In 1917, Hughes was called up for service in the First World War. Rev. W. T. Pearce became Acting Headmaster until Hughes returned after the war. The college suffered a great loss in 1922 when Hughes became ill and died in Japan while on his way back to England on sick leave. In that year, the London Missionary Society transferred Rev. L. G. Phillips from Amoy to Hong Kong. He served as Headmaster for over two years.

With Phillips's departure in 1924 and troubles in connection with the premises at 80 Bonham Road, the college entered another difficult period. The premises were rented from the government who now wanted to auction them off. The School Committee requested to be allowed to buy the property but there aroused a dispute with the Rhenish Mission even though the rental had originally been undertaken with a view to protecting the property and preserving it for the German mission. The committee contemplated closing the school, but eventually, the dispute was resolved and the college continued its operation under the headship of Richard Shum.

Expansion period (1929–1963)
In 1927, the college decided to build its own campus. Shum succeeded in raising over six thousand dollars from the staff and students. Together with fourteen thousand dollars from the Provident Fund and a government subvention of twenty thousand dollars, the School Committee decided to construct the new school building on the site of Mongkok Church at Bute Street in Mongkok, with the understanding that the college was to share its new hall with Mongkok Church. The government withdrew its financial aid when construction work was underway and the college was completed in September 1928 with the aid of some loans.

In 1930, Shum resigned and the London Missionary Society agreed to urgent appeals from the School Committee that Rev. Frank Short should be allowed to serve the college as Headmaster. Rev. Short administered and developed the college so well that it was restored to the Grant List. The extra funds thus gained made improvement in facilities possible. Rev. Frank Short continued in office until 1938 when he had to devote more time to the administrative work for the London Missionary Society. Herbert Noble, who taught in the college since 1933, succeeded Short.

In December 1941, Hong Kong fell into the control of the Imperial Japan. The school building itself, commandeered by the Japanese authorities, was used as a P.W.D. depot. Mr Noble, being a member of the naval volunteers, was taken a prisoner of war.

At the closure of the war, the school building was restored to the School Committee and the college was re-opened in November 1945. Noble convalesced in London and was temporarily substituted by the senior master Yung Kai-yin. When Noble resumed duty in 1946, the enrolment had increased to such an extent that around 600 students crammed into the building originally designed for 350. The college premises in Bute Street, Mongkok proved to be too small to operate an ideal school. A project for building a new school was therefore contemplated and negotiations resulted in the selling of the existing land and building to the Mongkok Church.

With a plot of land granted by the Government as the college site, the school authority started the construction of a new campus in 1B Oxford Road, Kowloon Tong. The construction work suffered repeated setbacks concerning its location, foundation and plan. It was only through the zealous efforts of Noble, who exhausted himself, and the magnanimity of the public, who made generous donations, that the project was realised in June 1962. In the same year, Mr Daniel P. K. Au officiated at the foundation ceremony. The new campus was opened by Sir Robert Black, the Governor of Hong Kong, in October 1963.

Oxford Road period (1963–2003)
The Oxford Road campus was situated in a tranquil neighbourhood with adequate facilities. It was also a highly regarded school zone with some of the top schools in Hong Kong situated there. The college has reached its first climax during this period. But Herbert Noble, after serving the college for 30 years, retired in 1964 on account of his poor health. He returned to England soon after retirement and died in December 1964. He was remembered for his dedicated service and remarkable contributions which helped enhance the prestige of the school. The College Hall, for both the Oxford Road and later the Sham Shui Po campuses, known as the Noble Hall, was named after Mr Noble.

On the other hand, Ying Wa Primary School was forced to close down due to lack of space of the new campus. It was not until 40 years later that the primary school division was re-established.

The London Missionary Society, the then sponsoring body of the college, merged with other missionaries to form the Council for World Mission. The sponsorship of the college was subsequently handed over to the Hong Kong Council of the Church of Christ in China. A board of directors was established. Terence Iles was appointed to succeed Noble as headmaster.

Iles was most active in organising various extracurricular activities, with a view to developing students' all-roundedness. He had established the house system, in which students were divided into different houses upon arrival to the school. This intensified the competitive spirit within inter-house competitions, such as the Swimming Galas and the Athletic Meets. Speech Day and Open Day were first held during Iles's headship. The college newspaper, Torch, was first published in 1964, making it the earliest school publication in Hong Kong. School teams joined various Hong Kong inter-school activities and competitions. In 1968, the school established its first Chinese Society to remind students of the importance of learning traditional Chinese culture in "the reciprocal cultivation of English and Chinese literature and the diffusion of Christianity".

In 1969, Iles admitted 15 girls to Form 6. This was controversial, but for some, a rather welcoming move.

After 8 years of devoted service, Iles resigned in 1972 and was succeeded by Mr Rex King. In addition to improving the school facilities, he also attended to pupils' application, which resulted in marked progress in academic work. His efforts in promoting Putonghua was pioneering. During his headship, the number of classes rose to 31 while the number of students reached around 1200. When King resigned in 1978, Mr Mui Ho-bun replaced him as headmaster. 12 years later, Mui retired in 1990. An old boy and former member of the Legislative Council, Mr. Yeung Po-kwan, took over the reins.

Yeung reintroduced the house system that was suspended for decades in 1991. He promoted the democratisation of school policies and established the Parent Teacher Association.

In 2000, the board of directors put in an application to the government for the construction of a millennium campus (aka Y2K campus) on a plot of reclaimed land in West Kowloon. It also decided to re-establish the primary school division and consequently joined the Through-train scheme with effect from September 2003. The new campus at Ying Wa Street was officially opened in July 2003. The Primary School also had its first intake in September 2003.

The Millennium (2003–present)
 
The relocation of the college was wildly debated within the school. Some feared that by withdrawing from the Kowloon Tong school zone, the standard of the college would be lowered. Others deemed that the Sham Shui Po District was far too distracting for the school to be set up there. But so far, it was proven that the new campus provided students with more space to engage in activities. Students also organised service projects to serve the neighbourhood, which was regarded as the poorest in Hong Kong.

Yeung stepped down in 2003 and was succeeded by Mr Roger Lee, an old boy of class 1979. Students were encouraged to join various kinds of activities and competitions and has won a lot of inter-school sports and music awards. In 2004, the handball team won the Inter-school Handball Competition for the tenth consecutive year.

The Ying Wa Heritage, a school museum, was established in 2005. Old artefacts and documents relating to the college were displayed, including a Bible published by the college back in the 19th century. Some of them were on display in an exhibition of the Hong Kong Museum of Education of the Hong Kong Institute of Education in 2012.

In March 2007, the board of directors decided to join the Direct Subsidy Scheme (DSS) with effect from September 2007, making it the ninth school in Hong Kong to join the DSS.

Roger Lee informed the students of his decision to leave the school in March 2011. Mr Allan Cheng, the Vice-Principal(Academic) and an old boy, served as the Acting Principal since September 2011.

On 11 November 2011, a celebration fun day for the 193rd anniversary of the college was held. It was the biggest anniversary celebration activity held since 2003.

On 23 November 2012, the Supervisor of the college confirmed that Cheng would become the Principal with effect from 1 January 2013, subject to final approval from the Education Bureau.

On 9 November 2018, Hong Kong Post issued a Stamp Sheetlet to celebrate the "Bicentenary of Ying Wa College." It features the College motto "Live the Mission, Brave the Course".

Didi Tang, in February 2021, stated that in light of the imposition of the Hong Kong National Security Law, Ying Wa "reportedly lost about 60 students in recent months."

Roster of Heads

House system

The house system was first introduced by Terence Iles during his headship in the 1960s. But it was later suspended and not until 1991 was it re-introduced by Yeung Po-kwan. The five houses, each with its own signature colour and mascot, commemorate five very important persons in the history of the school, namely Hoh Fuk Tong, Leung Faat, Milne, Morrison and Noble. The Houses, abbreviations, representative colours and mascots are as shown in the inset on the right.

Upon entering the Ying Wa College, new students are divided into five houses. The five houses compete every year in culture, music and athletics with a prize. The house with the highest overall score is awarded a trophy. Through this system, the competition encourages student excitement, achievement, school mate camaraderie and greater enthusiasm and school spirit. In the past, student was divided into houses according to their classes during secondary 1, i.e. students of the same class belonged to the same house. This policy has changed in recent years, where now there are members of the five houses in one class in secondary 1.

School song, school hymn, school cry

School song
"Home of Our Youth", written by Rupert Baldwin in 1938 is the school song; it is also a figuration of the College, a symbol of the brotherhood of the students. 

Home of our youth
To thee we bring the homage of lives at the spring
Training thy sons for the game of life
Sending them forth to the age-long strive
Ready thy name ever-bright to uphold
Ready ’gainst evil, to fight and be bold
May those who left thee in years that are past
Guard well thy honour, to truth holding fast
Home of our youth,To thee will we sing
Long may thy name on our lips proudly ring

School Hymn
The school hymn, "We build our School on Thee, O Lord" by Sebastian W. Meyer, is not used as frequently used as the school song; it is typically used in the Annual Speech Day amongst other ceremonious occasions. It is also used in some other schools in Hong Kong, including Sheng Kung Hui Lam Woo Memorial Secondary School, Sheng Kung Hui Tang Shiu Kin Secondary School, St. Paul's College and St Stephen's Girls' College.

School Cry
TWO, FOUR, SIX, EIGHT, WHAT DO WE APPRECIATE? YING WA! YING WA! WA! WA! WA!

The Ying Wa Cry is a mantra devised by former headmaster Mr Terence Iles for cheering purpose in inter-school sports events. Its use is not limited today, as students would chant spontaneously in various school events, like the swimming gala, the athletic meet and the school anniversary day.

There is a special tradition involving the Ying Wa Cry. Each time after the school song is sung (excluding formal events, e.g. events that take place in the Noble Hall), students would chant the cry continuously under the lead of one or more students, and the ceremony would end in a rumble of claps.

To lead the cry, one has to say (in Cantonese) "Ying Wa Boys: one, two, three..." (英華仔：一、二、三⋯⋯), and then the mass would follow "TWO, FOUR, SIX, EIGHT, WHAT DO WE APPRECIATE? YING WA! YING WA! WA! WA! WA!"

Extracurricular activities

Student Council
Established in the 1960s, the College Student Council is responsible for organising various kinds of in-school and inter-school activities. The Council consists of ten cabinet members, sub-committee members and representatives of different student bodies, including the Prefects' Board, the Houses, the Music Union, the Sports Union, the school newspaper editorial board, as well as other clubs and societies.

The Cabinet
The Cabinet of the Council consists of ten members:
 President;
 Vice-President;
 External Secretary;
 Internal Secretary;
 Treasurer;
 Secretary for Culture;
 Secretary for Welfare;
 Secretary for Recreation;
 Secretary for Publicity;
The election of the Council is usually held in October, in which members of the Cabinet are elected by the whole school, including teachers and students. If the Cabinet is not formed due to whatever reason, the previous Cabinet (i.e. that from last year) will continue their service until the end of the first term. This, however, has never happened. The Inauguration of the members of the Student Council, as well as the Clubs and Societies, will be held after the election. They are required to read out the Oath of Office after the Headmaster.

Once the Cabinet is formed, the cabinet members are responsible for the function of the Council. They are assisted by a group of sub-committee members in organising different events, such as the Annual Ball, Ying Wa Premier League (football) matches, YWBA (basketball) matches, celebrating events on the School Anniversary Day, etc.

The Nineteen Members' Board
The Nineteen Members' Board, known as the 'Big Nineteen' (or 十九大 in Chinese), consists of the ten members of the Cabinet as well as nine representatives of the student groups:
 Head Prefect - representing the Prefects' Board
 House Captains (5 in total) – representing the five Houses
 Music Captain – representing the Music Union
 Sports Captain – representing the Sports Union
 Chief Editor of Torch (the school newspaper) – representing the editorial board
The Board is responsible for passing the proposal and the budget of the Cabinet.

Notable alumni
Andrew Cheung Kui-nung: Permanent Judge of the Court of Final Appeal; 4th chief judge of the High Court of Hong Kong (2011 - 2018).
Hoh Fuk Tong: The first Chinese Reverend of the Protestant churches.
Leung Faat
Yuan Dehui
Antony Leung
Samuel Hui
The Young Men
Andrew Liao
Woo Kwok-hing

See also
Education in Hong Kong
List of secondary schools in Hong Kong
Robert Morrison (missionary)
London Missionary Society
The Hong Kong Council of the Church of Christ in China

References

Further reading

External links

 
 Ying Wa Primary School
 Ying Wa College Old Boys' Association
 Ying Wa Chain ( 英 華 點 將 錄 )
 HKCCCC Mongkok Church 中華基督教會望覺堂
 HKCCCC Ying Wa Church 中華基督教會英華堂
 Smith, Carl, "A sense of history (Part I). Ying Wa has the longest link with the past", Journal of the Royal Asiatic Society Hong Kong Branch, pp. 144–264, Vol. 26 (1986)
 Anglo-Chinese College Deed

Boys' schools in Hong Kong
Direct Subsidy Scheme schools
Through Train schools
Sham Shui Po
Educational institutions established in 1818
Hong Kong Council of the Church of Christ in China
Protestant secondary schools in Hong Kong